This is a list of the Spanish Singles number-ones of 1977.

Chart history

See also
1977 in music
List of number-one hits (Spain)

References

1977
Spain Singles
Number-one singles